New York State Route 433 (NY 433) is a  state highway located entirely in the town of North Castle in Westchester County, New York,  United States. NY 433 is one of six New York touring routes less than one mile (1.6 km) in length. The route was originally designated as part of NY 128 in the 1930s. NY 128 was truncated to its junction with NY 22 in Armonk in January 1971, at which time its former routing along North Greenwich Road was redesignated as NY 433.

Route description

NY 433 begins at the Connecticut state line in the town of North Castle. A northern, state-maintained continuation of Greenwich's Riversville Road, NY 433 proceeds north through North Castle as North Greenwich Road. NY 433 winds northward through a residential area of North Castle, passing the wooded Johnson Park on the southbound side of the highway. The route winds northward past several intersections with local streets, soon reaching the junction with NY 22 (Armonk–Bedford Road). The right-of-way continues north of NY 22 as Niles Avenue, while just east of this intersection are junctions with NY 128 and I-684 in Armonk.

History
When NY 128 was assigned as part of the 1930 renumbering of state highways in New York, it initially ended at NY 22 in Armonk. It was extended southward to the Connecticut state line in the mid-1930s over NY 22 and North Greenwich Road. The extension of NY 128 remained intact until January 1971 when NY 128 was cut back to its original terminus in Armonk. NY 128's former routing along North Greenwich Road was then re-designated as NY 433.

Major intersections

See also

References

External links

433
Transportation in Westchester County, New York